Zuni may refer to:

Peoples and languages 
 Zuni people, an indigenous people of the United States
 Zuni language, their language

Places 
 Zuni, Virginia, an unincorporated town in Virginia in the United States
 Zuni Pueblo, New Mexico, a census-designated place in New Mexico, United States
 Zuni Salt Lake, in New Mexico, United States
 Zuni River, in New Mexico and Arizona, United States
 Zuni Café, a restaurant in San Francisco, United States

Other uses 
 Zuni (rocket), an American missile
 USS Zuni (ATF-95), an American warship
 Applebay Zuni, a glider
 Zuni (website), a Vietnamese e-learning website

See also 
 Zuni ethnobotany
 Zuni mythology
 Zuni music
 Zune
 Zooni, a Hindi-language film

Language and nationality disambiguation pages